Paranormal television is a genre of reality television that purports to document factual investigations of the paranormal rather than fictional representations seen in traditional narrative films and TV. Over the years, the genre has grown to be a staple of television and even changed the programing focus of networks like the History Channel and the Travel Channel. By highlighting beliefs in topics ranging from Bigfoot to aliens, paranormal television continues to elevate popular interest in the paranormal.

History

Early precursors (1950s–1999) 
Accounts of supernatural occurrences have always been common in the print media. The 1705 pamphlet "A True Relation of the Apparition of One Mrs Veal" by Daniel Defoe is a well-known example. Paranormal television proper can trace its genesis to local TV news programs in the UK and USA, which have featured ghost stories since the 1960s. The earliest TV show devoted exclusively to the paranormal was One Step Beyond which broadcast 96 episodes on the ABC network from 1959 to 1961. The stories were promoted as being based on actual real-life experiences, including historically well-known events such as sinking of RMS Titanic, the 1906 San Francisco earthquake, and the assassination of Abraham Lincoln.

It was followed 15 years later by In Search of..., hosted by Leonard Nimoy which ran for six years from 1977 to 1982. Rod Serling was originally slated to host the series, but he died in 1975. In Search of... explored many paranormal topics, including UFOs, cryptozoological creatures (cryptids), lost civilizations, and other mysteries. Though the subject matter gradually lost popularity, the show gave way to future TV series following the same genre.

Unsolved Mysteries, which began airing in 1987 and ended in 2002, would feature paranormal cases from time to time, and further popularised the documentary aspect of paranormal television. Ghostwatch, a fictional news broadcast about a haunted house in the UK that aired in 1992, created controversy when a majority of viewers believed the televised show was real. Discovery Channel started to explore the genre with some success from 1996. The Fox Broadcasting Company aired a news-style oriented show Sightings which lasted for six years.

Reality Television (2000–present) 

In 2000, MTV's Fear premiered, merging nascent reality television with the storytelling of traditional horror films. The innovative show established the visual look, music and editing style of the paranormal reality television genre; most iconically, the format of investigators filming themselves with portable cameras as they become frightened exploring dark, unnerving environments. By the end of 2000, shows inspired by MTV's Fear began production for a growing range of networks, starting with Fox Family's Scariest Places on Earth, followed by  Murder in Small Town X  in 2001, Scare Tactics  in 2003. To-date, the genre  has grown into a staple of television.

Ghost Hunters premiered in 2004 on Sci Fi (later Syfy)  Sci Fi broadened into other paranormal shows, including Destination Truth. Ghost Adventures, another ghost-hunting program, which premiered on the Discovery Networks-owned Travel Channel in 2008, was the successor to a documentary film of the same name that aired on Sci Fi in 2007. A&E aired the prominent ghost-hunting series Paranormal State from 2007 to 2011, and History Channel began to compete in the general paranormal genre around this time with series such as UFO Files, MonsterQuest, UFO Hunters and the documentary special Ancient Aliens, which led to a successor series that began airing in 2010.

Syfy abandoned their focus on paranormal programming by 2015, and Ghost Hunters itself left the network in 2016 after 11 seasons. Around that time, Travel Channel moved completely into airing exclusively paranormal television series (the network initially centering programming around Ghost Adventures) frequently featuring ghost hunting, including series related to Ghost Adventures, as well as later productions featuring former Ghost Hunters members such as Kindred Spirits (2014–present) and Ghost Nation (2019–present). Destination America planned to compete with Travel Channel's paranormal programming (seasons 1-2 of Kindred Spirits aired on DA and TLC), but reversed course after it and TLC were reacquired by Discovery Networks during their acquisition of Scripps Networks Interactive in 2018. In 2019, Ghost Hunters was revived by A&E and aired a 12th season on the channel with a 13th season coming in 2020.

Reactions/critics 
Noting the recent trend in reality shows that take the paranormal at face value, The New York Times Culture editor Mike Hale characterized ghost hunting shows as "pure theater" and compared the genre to professional wrestling or soft core pornography for its formulaic, teasing approach.

Los Angeles Times staff writer Ed Stockly wrote that "the paranormal/supernatural-investigation subgenre that has cropped up on cable television over the last few years, which includes Ghost Hunters, Destination Truth, Ghost Adventures, Ghost Hunters International and a few others" promises to "take a skeptical approach in its investigations and to rely on science to confirm or disprove paranormal claims. So far not one has been able to consistently keep that promise."

Writer Diane Dorby proposes that paranormal reality TV shows provide "plausibility structures" that people use for "interpreting the meaning and experience of death".

According to science writer Sharon A. Hill, "Paranormal reality TV shows are designed as entertainment for the curious, not science documentaries to discover truths. If the tempo is too slow it will be sped up by giving "reality" a boost".

Programs

| -
| Conjuring Kesha || 2022
|}

See also
 List of ghost films

References

 
Television genres
Pseudoscience